The Córas Iompair Éireann 421 Class was a railway locomotive, built by the CIÉ at Inchicore Works between 1962–1963 and designed for branch line traffic use and shunting.

Unlike the earlier E401 class, these locomotives were fitted for multiple operation. They were of C wheel arrangement.

They were numbered E421–E434, and were withdrawn from service between 1979 and 1983.

Three of these locomotives have been preserved, as follows:
 E421 and E432: Owned by and based at the Downpatrick and County Down Railway, Northern Ireland.  Both locos are currently stored out of traffic.
  E428 had recently moved from Inchicore Works to Dunsandle, Co. Galway under private ownership.

Model 
The E421 was available as a resin model from "Q Kits", but this company is no longer trading as the owner has retired.

References

External links 

 Eiretrains - Irish Locomotives
 E428 at Dunsandle

Iarnród Éireann locomotives
Diesel-hydraulic locomotives
C locomotives
5 ft 3 in gauge locomotives
Diesel locomotives of Ireland
Railway locomotives introduced in 1962